Ondřej Lysoněk (born 3 September 1986) is a retired Czech football player who played in the Czech First League for Slovácko. He subsequently played for clubs in lower leagues.

References

External links
 
 

1986 births
Living people
Czech footballers
Czech Republic youth international footballers
Czech Republic under-21 international footballers
Association football defenders
Czech First League players
1. FC Slovácko players